The 2021 Tigray offensive, known by the Ethiopian government as the final offensive, was an airstrike operation launched on 8 October 2021 by the Ethiopian government and allied forces following a three month lull in fighting.

Wollo airstrikes
On 8 October 2021, Tigrayan spokesperson Getachew Reda said an intensive air campaign by the Ethiopian Air Force (ETAF) began against TDF positions in North Wollo and North Gondar zones of the Amhara Region, mostly around the towns of Wegeltena, Wurgessa and Haro.

Mekelle airstrikes
On 18 October, Tigray forces reported airstrikes in Mekelle, which were first denied, later admitted by the Ethiopian government. The Ethiopian government, however, later admitted to carrying out the airstrikes, saying they targeted rebel's communications and weapons facilities. Media controlled by the Tigray People's Liberation Front (TPLF) said three civilians had been killed in the airstrikes.

Fighting around Dessie

On 30 October 2021, it was reported this city has fallen to Tigray Defence Forces. This has been a significant development, since Ethiopia has been conducting an offensive on the TDF, but in the end a city of over 600,000+ inhabitants has fallen into the hands of the Tigray forces. On 31 October 2021, the twin town Kombolcha, with its airport, industrial zone and fuel depot, was also controlled by the Tigray Defence Forces, after ENDF left it without engaging in warfare.

References

2021 in Ethiopia
2021 in international relations
October 2021 events in Africa
O
Military campaigns
Airstrikes during the Tigray War
2021 airstrikes